Michel Sogny (born 21 November 1947 in Pau, France) is a French pianist, composer, and writer of Hungarian descent. He developed a new approach to teaching the piano. His method has enabled many students of all ages to enjoy practicing this instrument, as piano playing is generally considered to be unattainable if not taught during childhood

Biography
Michel Sogny attended École Normale de Musique de Paris, where he pursued piano studies under the direction of Jules Gentil and Yvonne Desportes. He holds a master's degree in psychology, a bachelor's degree in literature and a PhD in philosophy, which he completed at the Sorbonne in 1974 under the direction of Vladimir Jankélévitch. Michel Sogny is the founder of SOS Talents Foundation.

Michel Sogny emerged in the world of music in 1970s. Soon after, he established himself as an author of an innovative music learning method.

Along with Valéry Giscard d'Estaing and Franz Liszt's great-grand daughter, Blandine Ollivier de Prévaux, Sogny was one of the founding members of the Franz Liszt French Association.

In 1974 Michel Sogny founded a music school in Paris. As well he opened a literary and musical saloon where he gathered artists, writers and intellectuals.

In 1975, he published his first book, Admiration Créatrice chez List.  The preface to his book was written by György Cziffra.

In 1981 he wrote a song Comme un bateau ivre with Jeane Manson, who was his student at that time. Same year he appeared in television series Grâce à la Musique – Franz Liszt directed by François Reichenbach. He also opened 2nd music school in Geneva.

In 1985, Michel Sogny's piano method was introduced at the Bureau International du Travail à Genève, by its Director General Francis Blanchard, to integrate a cultural dimension within the organization.

Michel Sogny continued implementing his piano method throughout 1990s. He focused on working with young talented pianists.

On 15 March in 1993 he performed with his student Myriam Gramm, a piano piece for four hands – Grand Galop Chromatique of Franz Liszt at the stage of Grand Théatre de Genève.

In 1995, Sogny is invited as an Artistic Director at Villa Schindler, a musical institution in Austria, under the high patronage of Yehudi Menuhin. Under his guidance young pianists follow masterclasses and perform at international festivals. Some of Villa Schindler students, include well known pianists: Elisso Bolkvadze, Tamar Beraia, Khatia Buniatishvili, Yana Vassilieva and Anna Fedorova.

Michel Sogny founded SOS Talents Foundation. The main goal of the foundation is to support talented young musicians from economically poor backgrounds (who mostly come from Eastern European countries).  Pianists who are the nominees of the foundation, follow Sogny’s piano method and perform their program during various concerts.

The first gala concert of SOS Talents Foundation was held in 2001 at the Marcel Dassault Palace in Paris, with patronage of Serge and Nicole Dassault, participants included, Sogny’s students Yana Vassileva and Khatia Buniatishvili. Same year at the Théàtre des Champs-Élysées performed: Elisso Bolkvadze, Yana Vassilieva, Khatia Buniatishvili and her sister Gvantsa.

In 2002, SOS Talents Foundation hosted an international festival in Montreux, Switzerland. Well-known pianist Aldo Ciccolini took stage along young nominees – Elisso Bolkvadze, Tamar Beraia, Khatia Buniatishvili and Yana Vaissileva.

In 2004, in Coppet, Switzerland, Michel Sogny founded the new festival Festival de Piano Michel Sogny.

In 2009, under the patronage of President of Lithuania, Valdas Adamkus, Sogny hosted gala concert of SOS Talents Foundation in Vilnius.

After 40 years of pedagogical experience, Michel Songy continues to discover a new generation of pianists within his project, SOS Talents Foundation.

In 2013, Michel Sogny introduces thriller L’Adulte Prodige. The book narrates the story of a young musician Michele Paris.

In 2014, Michel Sogny publishes his philosophical work, De Victor Hugo à Dostoïevsky, a dialogue with Alexis Philonenko.

Throughout 2017–2019, Michel Sogny is invited to Georgia to hold master classes in the framework of the Batumi International Festival. He is accordingly invited to Japan, at Ishikawa Music Academy.

Michel Sogny piano method
Sogny’s methodology is taught at his schools in Paris and Geneva. Since 1974, more than 20,000 students are mastering piano by Sogny’s method.

The method consists of two main components: Didactic works – Prolégomènes, which represent small exercises. Polégomènes develop the perception of musical symphony and sound. The second direction consists of the cycle of etudes, where the concentration is on development of technical skills, as hand gestures and positions.

One of Sogny’s students, who started piano practice already as an adult, was a French language professor Michel Paris. After completing Sogny’s 4-year methodology course, at the age of 30 she performed a solo concert at Théâtre des Champs-Élysée with the patronage of Ministry of Culture.

Michel Sogny's another successful student was Claudine Zévaco, who performed at Théâtre des Champs-Élysée in 1983 and 1984.

In 1981, the Senate formally addressed the Minister of Culture, Jack Lang to discuss the introduction of Michel Song's methodology throughout whole France.

Pianist and Composer
Miche Sogny is the author of didactic works for piano, on which he based his own methodology. Some of his most recognised works are: Prolégomènes à une Eidétique Musicale, Les Paralipomènes à une Eidétique Musicale and Études pour piano.

He is also an author of musical compositions : Furia, Triptyque, Entrevisions, Dérive, Hommage à Liszt, Aquaprisme, Réminiscentiel, Trois pièces dans le style hongrois, Deux Études de concert, Reviviscence.

Published works 
 L'admiration créatrice chez Liszt, ed. Buchet-Chastel (1975)
 Le solfège sans soupir, ed. Sirella (1984)
 Abrégé de solfège, ed. Sirella
 La méthode en question(s), ed. Sirella
 La méthode en action, ed. Sirella
 Initiation à l'art de la composition musicale, ed. Sirella
 Le pédagogue virtuose – livre de l'enseignant, ed. Sirella
 La Musique en Questions, entretiens avec Monique Philonenko Ed. Michel de Maule (2009)
 "L'adulte prodige – Le rêve au bout des doigts" Editions France-Empire (2013)
 De Victor Hugo à Dostoïevski – Entretiens philosophiques avec Alexis Philonenko, éditions France-Empire (2013)

Scores 
 Œuvres choisies (sélection des principales œuvres du répertoire pianistique doigtées et commentées)
 Études pour piano – Séries I à VII
 Etudes de perfectionnement
 Deux Etudes de Concert
 Prolégomènes à une eidétique musicale pour piano 2 mains – Séries I à VII
 Prolégomènes à une eidétique musicale pour piano 2, 6 et 12 mains
 Pièces de concert pour piano (Triptyque, Aquaprisme, Furia, Réminiscentiel, Hommage à Franz Liszt, Deux études de concerts, 3 pièces dans le style hongrois, Un certain clair de lune )
 Dérive pour piano Editions Durand (enregistré chez Cascavelle par la pianiste Elisso Bolkvadze)
 Entrevisions 12 pièces pour piano crée sur Mezzo TV par la pianiste Elisso Bolkvadze (Éditions Durand)
 12 études pour piano dans le style hongrois Séries I à IV (Éditions Durand)
 12 pièces pour piano pour la main droite seule (dedicated to pianist France Clidat)
 Paralipomènes à une eidétique musicale 14 pièces pour piano Editions Musicales Artchipel
 Hommage à Liszt Editions Durand
 Aquaprisme Editions Durand
 3 Pièces dans le style hongrois Editions Durand
 48 Etudes de Perfectionnement Editions Musicales Artchipel
 Etudes pour piano Deuxième série Editions Musicales Artchipel
 24 Pensées Vagabondes Editions Musicales Artchipel
 Reviviscence  14 pièces pour piano

Honours and awards
 Order of Honor, Georgia (2017)
 Honorary Consul of Lituania in Switzerland
 UNESCO Diploma of Honour (1994)
 United Nations Peace Medal (1986)

Related links 
 Michel Sogny Official Website
 Michel Sogny, l’art de la résilience Le Figaro
 Michel Sogny Academy
 Michel Sogny Personal Website
 SOS Talents Foundation
 Works at Artchipel
 https://www.laflutedepan.com/recherche?Effiltre=1&Effiltre2=0&tri=0&page=0001&boutique=&instrument=&style=&motcle=michel+sogny

References 

21st-century French male classical pianists
20th-century French male classical pianists
20th-century French composers
École Normale de Musique de Paris alumni
Living people
1947 births
People from Pau, Pyrénées-Atlantiques